John Ord (1729–1814) was an English barrister and politician who sat in the House of Commons from 1774 to 1790.

Life
The son of Robert Ord and Mary Darnell, he was educated at Newcome's School in Hackney and Trinity College, Cambridge. He graduated B.A. in 1750, and then held a lay fellowship.

Called to the bar at Lincoln's Inn, Ord in 1777 became Attorney-General of the Duchy of Lancaster, and in 1778 master in chancery. He stood unsuccessfully for Morpeth in 1761. He was Member of Parliament for Midhurst, Hastings, and Wendover (1774–1790), and was some time chairman of ways and means in the House of Commons. 

Ord was known also for his garden at Purser's Cross near Fulham in London, which he laid out in 1756, and where exotic trees grew. The variety "Ord's Apple" was raised there by his sister-in-law Anne Simpson. Also known as "Simpson's Pippin" or "Simpson's Seedling", it was from seed of the Newtown Pippin.

Ord was a member of the Horticultural Society, and from 1780 a Fellow of the Royal Society. He died on 6 June 1814, and was buried in Fulham churchyard.

Notes

Attribution

1729 births
1814 deaths
English barristers
Fellows of Trinity College, Cambridge
Fellows of the Royal Society
Members of the Parliament of Great Britain for English constituencies
British MPs 1774–1780
British MPs 1780–1784
British MPs 1784–1790
Members of Lincoln's Inn
People educated at Newcome's School
Alumni of Trinity College, Cambridge